Michael Koukoulakis (born 25 June 1975 in Heraklion) is a Greek football referee. He belongs to the Heraklion association. He has been an international referee for FIFA since 2008.

Koukoulakis has served as a referee for international competitions, including UEFA Euro 2012 qualification and the 2010 and 2014 World Cup qualifiers.

References

External links
 
 
 

Greek football referees
1975 births
Living people
Sportspeople from Heraklion